Associação Atlética Mackenzie College, commonly known as Mackenzie College, was a Brazilian football team from São Paulo, São Paulo state. They competed several times in the Campeonato Paulista.

History
Associação Atlética Mackenzie College was founded on August 18, 1898. Belfort Duarte was one of the club's founders. They competed in the Campeonato Paulista during the 1900s, and consistently competed during all the 1910s. The club merged with Portuguesa in 1920, and was then renamed to Mackenzie-Portuguesa, competing in the Campeonato Paulista in 1920, 1921 and in 1922. The merger ended in 1923, and then Mackenzie College folded.

References

Association football clubs established in 1898
Association football clubs disestablished in 1923
Football clubs in São Paulo
Defunct football clubs in São Paulo (state)
1898 establishments in Brazil
1923 disestablishments in Brazil